Edmond Marie Petitjean (5 July 1844, Neufchâteau - 7 August 1925, Paris) was a self-taught French painter; known for landscapes and seascapes.

Biography 

His father was a lawyer and wanted him to follow suit; forcing him to study law despite his artistic talent and sending him to Paris, where he was apprenticed to a notary. While there, he visited the museums and became determined to be an artist. His parents cut off his financial support, but he was able to find employment managing a small factory in Nancy. This enabled him to purchase the painting supplies he needed. 

In 1874, he held his first solo exhibit at the Salon des Artistes Français. He was awarded honorable mention at the Salon of 1881 and, two years later, became a member. This was followed by a First Class medal in 1884 and a Second Class medal in 1885.

He painted in several ports along the Atlantic coast and spent a year working in Dordrecht. He participated in decorating several pavilions at the Exposition Universelle (1889) and was presented with a silver medal. The following year, he exhibited in  Munich. In 1892, he was named a Knight in the Legion of Honor.

He was assigned to work in the "Salle dorée" (Golden Room), themed to represent the Mediterranean coast, and painted a scene depicting the village of Le Puy. His study for the painting received a gold medal at the Exposition Universelle (1900). 

In 1904, he married , also a painter, who was thirty-one years his junior. Until the beginning of World War I, he exhibited internationally and was awarded a silver medal at the Alaska-Yukon-Pacific Exposition in 1909. Overall, he is believed to have created almost 800 paintings.

As did many artists during the period, he also provided illustrations and cartoons for periodicals; notably the satirical journals, L'Assiette au Beurre and Le Rire.

References

Further reading 
 Louise Gaggini, et al., Le Train Bleu, Éd. Presse Lois Unis Service, Paris, 1990  
 Pierre Heili, "Edmond-Marie Petitjean" in: Albert Ronsin (ed.), Les Vosgiens célèbres. Dictionnaire biographique illustré, Éditions Gérard Louis, Vagney, 1990

External links 

Petitjean's Paintings Web Gallery Homepage
ArtNet: More works by Petitjean.

1844 births
1925 deaths
19th-century French painters
20th-century French painters
20th-century French male artists
French landscape painters
French illustrators
People from Neufchâteau, Vosges
19th-century French male artists